Chennimalai is a former state assembly constituency in Erode district in Tamil Nadu, India.

Members of Legislative Assembly

Election results

1962

1957

References

External links
 

Erode district
Former assembly constituencies of Tamil Nadu